Antoine de Montazet (17 August 1713 – 2 May 1788) was a French theologian, of Jansenist tendencies, who became bishop of Autun and archbishop of Lyon. He was elected to the Académie française in 1756, but did not produce significant literary works.

Montazet was born in Laugnac. He had published for his seminary by the Oratorian Joseph Valla, six volumes of "Institutiones theologicæ". These were known as "Théologie de Lyon", and were spread throughout Italy by Scipio de' Ricci, bishop of Pistoia and Prato, until condemned by the Index in 1792. Contrary to the papal bull of Pope Pius V on the Roman Breviary, Montazet changed the text of the Breviary and the Missal. The later efforts of Pope Pius IX and Cardinal Bonald to suppress the innovations of Montazet provoked resistance on the part of the canons, who defended the traditional Lyonnese ceremonies.

References

External links
Catholic Hierarchy page

1713 births
1788 deaths
People from Lot-et-Garonne
18th-century French Catholic theologians
Jansenists
Bishops of Autun
Archbishops of Lyon
Members of the Académie Française
18th-century Roman Catholic archbishops in France
18th century in Lyon